Joseph Lawrence Reichler (January 1, 1915 – December 12, 1988) was an American sports writer who worked for the Associated Press from 1943 to 1966. He mostly covered the New York City based baseball teams. Reichler also wrote many baseball books, and worked for the Office of the Commissioner of Baseball.

In 1982, it was discovered that he sold items that had earlier been donated to the Baseball Hall of Fame to cover his financial problems.

He was awarded the J. G. Taylor Spink Award by the National Baseball Hall of Fame and Museum in 1980.

References

Further reading

Articles
 Reichler, Joe (AP). "Ruth Considers Ty Cobb As Greatest of Players". Ironwood Daily Globe. August 24, 1945.
 United Press International. "Flood: 'Or I'll Go Crazy'". The Chicago Daily Defender.  1971.
 Smith, Red. "Sports of the Times: Some of the Things Joe Reichler Knows". The New York Times.  1981.
 Anderson, Dave. "Sports of the Times: Historian of Big Trades". The New York Times. November 1, 1984.
 Anderson, Dave. "Sports of the Times: From Little Eva to Whale Walters". The New York Times. May 15, 1988.

Books
 Danzig, Allison; Reichler, Joe (1959). The History of Baseball: Its Great Teams, Players and Managers. Englewood Cliffs: Prentice-Hall. 
 Reichler, Joe; Olan, Ben (1960). Baseball's Unforgettable Games. New York: Ronald Press.
 Walker, Mickey; Reichler, Joe (1961). Mickey Walker: The Toy Bulldog & His Times. New York: Random House.
 Reichler, Joe (1964). Ronald Encyclopedia of Baseball. New York: Ronald Press.
 Reichler, Joe (1976). The Game and the Glory. Englewood Cliffs, N.J.: Prentice-Hall. .
 Reichler, Joe (1979). The Baseball Encyclopedia: The Complete and Official Record of Major League Baseball. New York: Macmillan. .

External links
Baseball Hall of Fame
Obituary

1915 births
1988 deaths
Sportswriters from New York (state)
Baseball writers
BBWAA Career Excellence Award recipients
20th-century American non-fiction writers